Klepsch is a German surname. Notable people with this surname include:

 Egon Klepsch (1930–2010), German politician 
 Winfried Klepsch (born 1956), German long jumper

German-language surnames